Woolf College is the University of Kent's fifth college and the first new college for 35 years. It is on Giles Lane, in Canterbury, England. This college offers 503 en suite bedrooms in flats of 5 to 8 occupants and 41 studio apartments in 9 blocks, all with network connections and access to fully equipped kitchens. Tenancy at Woolf College for a fixed 51-week contract which is managed by UPP.

Overview

Woolf College is reserved for postgraduate students. It was named after the writer Virginia Woolf and has:
 6 seminar rooms
 1 lecture theatre (496 seats)
 1 reception/foyer
 1 social room

References

University of Kent
2008 establishments in England
Educational institutions established in 2008